The 2017–18 VTB United League was the 9th complete season of the VTB United League. It is also the fifth season that the league functions as the Russian domestic first tier level. It started on 5 October 2017 with the first round of the regular season and ended on 10 June 2018 with the championship game of the Final Four. CSKA Moscow were the defending champions.

CSKA Moscow successfully defended its title as it won the final over Khimki.

Format changes
From this season, the top eight teams qualify for the playoffs. These are played in a best-of-five format with a 1–2–2 structure. The four teams that win their playoff series qualify for the Final Four tournament, which decides the new champion.

Teams
A total of 13 teams from five countries contest the league, including nine sides from Russia, one from Belarus, one from Estonia, one from Kazakhstan and one from Latvia.

Venues and locations

Personnel and sponsorship

Regular season
In the regular season, teams play against each other twice (home-and-away) in a double round-robin format. The top eight teams advance to the playoffs. The regular season started on 5 October 2017.

Standings

Results

Playoffs
In the playoffs, a best-of-five games format is used. The team that wins the series will be the first team to win three games. The first game will be played on the playing court of the four highest-place teams, the second and third game will be played on the playing court of the next four highest-place teams and the fourth and fifth game, if necessary, will be played on the playing court of the four highest-place teams. The playoffs started on 23 May 2018.

|}

Final Four

The four winners of the quarterfinals qualified for the inaugural Final Four. The Final Four will be held from 8 until 10 June. In April 2018, it was announced that the VTB Ice Palace in Moscow, Russia will host the tournament.

Final standings

Attendance
Attendance include playoff games:

Awards

Season Awards
Scoring Champion
 Alexey Shved – Khimki
Young Player of the Year
 Isaiah Briscoe – Kalev
Top Performance of the Year
 Stevan Jelovac – Nizhny Novgorod
Defensive Player of the Year
 Dmitry Kulagin – Nizhny Novgorod
Sixth Man of the Year
 Jamar Smith – UNICS
Coach of the Year
 Dimitrios Itoudis – CSKA Moscow
Regular Season MVP
 Nando de Colo – CSKA Moscow
Final Four MVP
 Sergio Rodríguez – CSKA Moscow

MVP of the Month

VTB United League clubs in European competitions

References

External links
Official website

 
2017-18
2017–18 in European basketball leagues
2017–18 in Russian basketball
2017–18 in Latvian basketball
2017–18 in Estonian basketball
2017–18 in Belarusian basketball
2017–18 in Kazakhstani basketball